Frequency by Nick Gilder was released in 1979 on the Chrysalis record label.

In a 1979 review for the Birmingham Daily Post, Jonathan Daümler-Ford commented on "Gilder's annoying high vocals and the outstanding guitar work of James McCulloch".

Track listing 
All tracks composed by Nick Gilder and James McCulloch. 
 "(You Really) Rock Me" 2:45
 "Time After Time" 4:21
 "Metro Jets" 4:05
 "Electric Love" 3:10
 "The Brightest Star" 3:35
 "Watcher of the Night" 3:41
 "Worlds Collide" 4:54
 "Hold on Me Tonight" 6:02
 "Into the 80's" 2:53

Personnel 
Nick Gilder - vocals
James McCulloch - lead guitar, guitar synthesizer 
Eric Nelson - bass, backing vocals
Craig Krampf - drums, percussion
Jamie Herndon - guitar, synthesizer, backing vocals

Charts

References

The track "Time After Time" has been covered by American rock band Sugar High.

Nick Gilder albums
1979 albums
Chrysalis Records albums